The 1988 Uruguayan Primera División was the 84th season of the top tier in Uruguayan football.

It was contested by 13 teams in a round-robin format. Danubio won the league title for the first time in its history. Danubio's Rubén da Silva was the top scorer, with 23 goals.

League standings

References

Uruguayan Primera División seasons
1
Uru